Dooly the Little Dinosaur is a cartoon serialized from 1983 to 1993 by South Korean cartoonist Kim Soo-jung with a little dinosaur as the subject, and it refers to animations and other media mix works based on the original. It is a 1987 South Korean comic series and animated film and television series created by Kim Soo-jung. Dooly is one of the most respected and commercially successful characters of South Korean animation. It was printed in 1995 in South Korea. Dooly also has a resident registration card, which means he is a citizen of South Korea.

History 
Dooly was first created when its creator Soo-Jung Kim issued the manhwa (comics in Korean) under the comic book named Bo-Mool Sum (Treasure Island). It was first shown in the first week of April 1983, and ended about ten years later. There are two spin-offs of the manhwa, one of which is still being published today.

The original animation and airing were done by South Korean broadcaster KBS. When it was first broadcast in 1987, there were only six episodes, with seven more added later during the second season. A video cassette was released in 1989, and re-broadcasting was first done in 1990.

The show was rebroadcast in 1993, 1996 and 1998, but due to the choice of inappropriate broadcasting dates (usually on Sunday), its recognizance and the viewer rating were critically low. In October 1998, however, KBS noticed the increased viewership, and the broadcasting time was changed to 5:30 p.m. Monday and Tuesday (known as the 'Golden Viewing Time') starting May 12 through June 23, 2003. With more people watching the show, its ratings improved. A new version of the TV series, which began broadcasting in 2009, is currently shown Monday through Friday, at 4:00 PM on the Korean Animation channel Tooniverse, Korea's first all-anime/manhwa channel.

The cartoon was once reported to the officials as a bad example for children because of the use of Dooly's care-giver's name in a friendly fashion. Koreans usually speak to adults with respect and with the use of proper additions in speech done so specifically for adults by younger people. This was seen as hazardous for the basic thinking of the children who watch it.

Tooniverse also released an educational English dub in 1995, and a theatrical release came out in 1996 under Dooly Nara (Dooly Nation).

One of the main characters in It's Okay to Not Be Okay is a fan of the cartoon.

Characters
Dooly is a baby dinosaur that was kidnapped by aliens, who had experimented to give him magical powers. When he returned to Earth, he was trapped in an ice glacier causing him to faint during the Ice Age. About 100 million years later, one of the glaciers broke off and he came to Seoul. Standing 4 feet and 6 inches tall, Dooly is a Ceratosaurus with an oversized head, meant to draw attention toward the character's facial expression, which he rarely changes. He has a tail as long as his height, and he sometimes uses it to make himself look taller than other characters, usually Kildong Go. He displays many human-like characteristics, including a habit of sticking out his tongue. His underside is full-white, as are his hands and feet. He has three toes per foot, and has five fingers on each hand, unlike a real Ceratosaurus which has four. He also has shiny white teeth. He is like a typical kid who likes to eat and play all the time, but he can come across as being somewhat audacious, living the life of an orphan. Behind his thoughtful words, Dooly is just another baby dinosaur who misses his mother dinosaur. While in Seoul, he was found by a girl named Younghee, and because she mistook Dooly for a dog she took him home with her and her elder brother Chulsoo (철수), and made him live with her as a pet. However, her father Kildong hates Dooly and just beats Dooly up whenever he is annoying. Dooly has superpowers that he received from an extraterrestrial, but doesn't know why. He doesn't quite know how to use it deliberately but in times of danger, he somehow manages to use the power. He points his right finger and yells 'Hoihoi!' He is always biting his tongue and looking silly, but he is both mischievous and loyal. Once in a while, he'll resist, like when he turns Kildong into a dinosaur and sends him to the Amazon, but whenever he does, it always turns against him. Dooly's name, according to the cartoon, is a pun. His older sister - Dooly called her 'brother' because he confused that exact nominal - is named Hana, meaning One or First while Dool, or Dul mean Two in Korean and y or ei mean the same thing in Korean Traditional-Chinese, making him the Second. This is mentioned around the end of then 2nd set of episodes, or the 6th episode, but it is not certain if this is true in manhwa canon due to the anime and manhwa having many storyline differences. While Dooly is having adventures in Seoul and having fun, he meets three friends who Kildong hates too and beats up, all except Heedong (희동).
Go Heedong came to live with Uncle Kildong after his parents went abroad to study. He misses his mom every day, but feels utterly entertained by Dooly the Brother. Thanks to the excessive amounts of time he spends with Dooly, he isn't afraid of anything. He is also really good at biting or scratching someone when they make him mad. He has broken Douner's Time Cosmos' Spaceship.
Douner the Prince of Planet 'Kanttappia' makes an emergency landing on the planet Earth due to the malfunctioning of the 'Time Cosmos' Spaceship. His head may be really hard and his thoughts very simple, but the word "loyalty" was made for Douner. He can travel back and forth in time and space in the Time Cosmos Spaceship which looks like a violin.
Ddochi, the Ostrich that successfully escaped from a Las Vegas circus troop, always insists that she used to be a noble mistress from Africa. She is a little bit selfish, and a little bit shy, but Ddochi is the most softhearted ostrich that anyone will ever come across. She also insists on calling herself a girl. Ddochi has many talents she learned from the circus.
Michol (pronounced as "Maikol") is an aspiring singer who lives next to Kildong, and feeds on his passion for dreaming, though he may lack the necessary talent. He is quite lost most of the time, but does know how to take care of himself. Although he is South Korean, his appearance is noticeable different. His surname is Ma. According to his name, his role model is Michael Jackson. Dooly once joined a band with Douner and Michol.
Kildong Go (pronounced as "Gogildong") is an Uncle of Heedong and father of Chulsoo and Younghee. He usually scolds Dooly, Douner and Ttochi. He doesn't scold Heedong.
Chulsoo Go (pronounced as "Gocheoulsu") is a son of Kildong.
Younghee Go (pronounced as "Goyeonghee") is a daughter of Kildong.
Jeongja Park (pronounced as "Bagjeongja") is a kind-hearted wife of Kildong.

Controversy
When Dooly was first created as a TV animation, it received a lot of criticism from South Korean Catholics, South Korean citizens, and the government. Reasons cited included the fact that the animation was a bit violent, which was suppressed by the South Korean government, and the adult general public was angered due to its character's attitude of disrespect towards elders. However, this was when freedom of speech was not seriously taken into account. Generally speaking, the younger generation has fond memories of this series and find that the violence is actually a quite realistic portrayal of family dynamics in contemporary South Korea.

The character "Michol" has also received criticism in more recent years due to the character's appearance being likened to blackface. It had started when SNL Korea and the K-pop band Apink did a skit based on Dooly's Ramen Song, which prominently feature Michol, portrayed by Bomi. It had received massive controversy, but it was also defended due to the belief of her just attempting cosplay.

List of episodes

Original series (1987–1988)
 Season 1
 "The Birth of Dooly" (original airdate: October 7, 1987)
 "Grand Park Disturbance" (original airdate: October 7, 1987)
 "My Friends" (original airdate: October 7, 1987)
 "Hyeongah! Do Not Go" (original airdate: October 7, 1987)
 "Travel to the Past: Part 1" (original airdate: October 7, 1987)
 "Travel to the Past: Part 2" (original airdate: October 7, 1987)

 Season 2
 "Dooly's Anger" (original airdate: May 5, 1988)
 "Michol's Debut" (original airdate: May 5, 1988)
 "Ddochi's Escape" (original airdate: May 5, 1988)
 "The Strange Lamp" (original airdate: May 5, 1988)
 "Dooly's Miniature" (original airdate: May 5, 1988)
 "The Invaders from the Squid Planet: Part 1" (original airdate: May 5, 1988)
 "The Invaders from the Squid Planet: Part 2" (original airdate: May 5, 1988)

Baby Dinosaur Dooly - Ice Star Adventure (Movie, 1996)
Baby Dinosaur Dooly - The Great Adventure of the Ice Star is a Korean animated film released in 1996. It was produced with a production cost of 2 billion won and was released in 70 theaters nationwide on July 24, 1996. According to the Korean Film Yearbook, the number of viewers in Seoul was 126,872.

Dooly, trapped in a giant iceberg in Antarctica, floats to Seoul with the iceberg. Young-hee and Cheol-su, who mistook Doo-li for a doll lying on the bank of the river, bring Doo-li home to dry on a clothesline. The siblings' father, Gil-dong, can't beat Doo-li, who has supernatural powers, and brings him into the house, but he is anxious to get him out. Gil-dong's hatred grows with the addition of Dochi, Doner, and Michael. In response to Gil-dong's constant bullying, they ride a time cosmos and accidentally swept up to Hee-dong and Gil-dong, wandering through outer space, saying let's go to the future where they will be adults. Due to Dooly's mistake, the group arrives at the Ice Star where only souls live.

References

External links
 
 

Manhwa titles
1980s South Korean animated television series
South Korean animated films
South Korean children's animated television series
Animation controversies in television
Animated television series about dinosaurs
Television controversies in South Korea
Race-related controversies in animation
Race-related controversies in television
Tooniverse original programming